This is a list of main warships operated by the Romanian Navy during the Second World War. It includes major surface warships and submarines. Each surface warship in this list is armed with at least two main guns of a caliber greater than 4 inches (102 mm) or with torpedo tubes, and has a range of over 1,200 km (650 nautical miles). The fore-mentioned range is the minimum required for a journey along the maximum East-West extent of the Black Sea, which amounts to a distance of 1,175 km (730 miles or 635 nautical miles). The Black Sea was the naval front where the Royal Romanian Navy operated throughout the war.

Major surface warships

Submarines

References

World War II
Romanian Navy